The Swadeshi Jagran Manch  is a political and cultural pan-India movement that deals with economic issues. Since at least 2015 the SJM has been critical of foreign direct investment.

References

Political organisations based in India
Hindu organizations
1867 establishments in India
Organizations established in 1867